Pioneer Point is a pair of tall buildings in the Ilford area of London, United Kingdom. It is owned by Canadian Real Estate investors, RealStar.
Pioneer Point North is 105 metres (344 feet) tall with 33 floors and Pioneer Point South is 82 metres (269 feet) tall with 25 floors.

The mixed-use building contains residential units, a public gym, which occupies the second floor, and a restaurant. The buildings feature a lighting installation that displays daily video content with various colors, shapes, speeds, and directions.

Pioneer Point opened in 2011 on the site of the former Pioneer Market.

See also
 Tall buildings in London

References

Residential buildings completed in 2011
 
 
Residential skyscrapers in London
Ilford